Robotomy is an American animated television series created by Michael Buckley and Joe Deasy. The series ran from October 25, 2010 to January 24, 2011 on Cartoon Network. The series revolves around Thrasher (Patton Oswalt) and Blastus (John Gemberling), two teenage outcast robots who enter high school at their home planet Insanus. It was produced by World Leaders Entertainment in New York (in association with Cartoon Network Studios), and co-executively produced and directed by Christy Karacas, creator of Superjail! and Ballmastrz: 9009. The series was the result of numerous failed pitches to the network by the creators.

Plot

Thrasher and Blastus are two teenage robots who live on the planet of Insanus. Their planet is inhabited by murderous robots who seek to kill one another for no apparent reason. Slightly less horrific than their peers, the duo seeks to make it through high school, and navigate their lives with mixed results. Thrasher (Patton Oswalt), a tall and lanky robot, wishes to gain the affections of an attractive female robot named Maimy (Jessie Cantrell). Meanwhile, Blastus (John Gemberling), a short and rotund robot, just wants to be popular. As with Blastus, unlike most robots on Insanus, he is mostly sensitive and non-criminal, much to the disapproval of his mother. In his quest to be cool, however, he is incredibly impulsive and overconfident in his abilities. Thrasher, though calm and reserved, often falls prey to Blastus' badly-thought out plans.

Other characters include various schoolmates and staff members. Weenus (Michael Sinterniklaas) is a nerdy, psychopathic robot who is even lower on the social pyramid than the protagonists. Dreadnot (Dana Snyder) is a teacher at Harry S. Apocalypse who finds joy in torturing and invoking pain into his students. Their principal, Thunderbite (also voiced by Snyder), is an oversized, skull-shaped robot who, when not causing pain, acts sweet and motherly to the students. Megawatt (also voiced by Sinterniklaas) is a spoiled rich kid who is attractive to the female robots, most of whom he blows up; to Thrasher's disdain, he is dating Maimy. Tacklebot (Roger Craig Smith), Megawatt's friend and musclehead jock, acts violent and hostile toward the protagonists.

Production

The series was created by Michael Buckley and Joe Deasy and produced by World Leaders Entertainment in New York. It was originally created with the working title Horrorbots. The network had contacted Buckley to create a series three years prior to the broadcast of Robotomy. He asked for Deasy's help, and together they pitched five ideas, to which all were rejected. Six months later, a second wave of ideas proved equally unsuccessful. Reaching their third trial, also six months later, the two pinpointed the rejections on them thinking within the network's mindset as opposed to their own. Frustrated with the project, they submitted a rough premise of Robotomy, which was accepted, much to their surprise. Buckley described the plot as when "Superbad meets the Transformers meets WWE."

According to the crew, the style of animation required a distinct set of skills, compared to another production by World Leaders, The Venture Bros. While that series was animated by the same team that did Batman: The Animated Series, Robotomy was done by the Chowder production team. In an interview, it was said that the style of the former team follows "perspective, anatomy, and real-world physics in animation", while the latter team laid its focus on "the humor of the movement and timing, squash and stretch," among other principles. Co-executive producer Christy Karacas's unique art style also proved laborious for them in that it provided "very clean polished lines" over more organic drawings. Karacas stated that the look and feel lent itself to science fiction, robotics as a whole and rock and roll. For its fictional universe, the planet of Insanus (originally called Killglobe), the production crew thought of it in unending chaos. This made way for weaponry covering the ground, a constant state of duskiness and the scarring of the land. Karacas particularly enjoyed designing and diversifying the robots in regard to their size and shape.

The show's color has been described by Karacas as a major part of the visuals; inspirations included Paul Klee and Katsuhiro Otomo, as well as the concept of fluorescence. The team wanted to create "a bold, fresh look" that reflected the universe, and so they chose to be minimal with their palette to attract attention to the linework. In addition, they eschewed the use of vivid primary colors and instead chose more secondary colors. However, they took to accentuate the scenes with "pop colors" that mimic the glow of neon lighting, and lastly, they added vertical reflections to the floors and grunge textures to the backgrounds.

Broadcast and reception
Robotomy premiered on October 25, 2010 on Cartoon Network, following a new episode of Mad. A crew member from World Leaders established that the network was doing more to blend its Adult Swim brand with its primary youth demographic. The series was ultimately targeted for an older demographic than other series on the network, although it still had to be appropriate to the "broad age range." The debut broadcast was seen by 1.7 million viewers in the United States, acquiring a 0.2 Nielsen rating for adults aged 18 to 49. The season received an average of 1.5 million viewers, also with a Nielsen rating of 0.2. After ten episodes, the series concluded on January 24, 2011, making it the shortest run of any original series on the network.

Renn Brown of Cinematic Happenings Under Development noted Oswalt, a high-profile actor, as contradictory to the show's short-lived run. Will Wade of Common Sense Media gave the series a lukewarm review, finding it suitable for older teens while calling it appealing to those who struggled to gain popularity in high school. Wade called the storylines "pretty thin" and its focus on "the imagery that sells the metaphor of school as a battlefield". Aaron Simpson of Lineboil called the storylines "irreverent" and the chaos similar to Superjail!, "minus the dismembered bodies". The series was eventually added to Netflix in 2013 after the service announced a deal with Warner Bros. to include programming from Cartoon Network series, among other shows.

Episodes

In other media
Blastus makes a cameo in the OK K.O.! Let's Be Heroes episode "Crossover Nexus".

References

External links

2010 American television series debuts
2011 American television series endings
2010s American animated television series
2010s American comic science fiction television series
2010s American high school television series
American children's animated drama television series
American children's animated comic science fiction television series
Dystopian animated television series
English-language television shows
Cartoon Network original programming
Television series by Cartoon Network Studios
Animated television series about robots
Teen animated television series